James Nesbitt is an actor from Northern Ireland whose filmography encompasses both television and film roles over a 30-year period. Nesbitt's screen career began in the early 1980s with uncredited roles in episodes of the BBC Play For Today strand, which he had while attached to the Riverside Theatre's youth group. His first credited role came in 1989, as a bit player in the John Ogdon biopic Virtuoso, which was followed by his first feature film role in 1991 in Hear My Song.

As a casual actor in the early 1990s, Nesbitt mixed television and film roles; he appeared in episodes of Boon, The Young Indiana Jones Chronicles, Covington Cross, Lovejoy, and Between the Lines. He also played roles in several Michael Winterbottom films, beginning with Loves Lies Bleeding in 1993 and continuing with Go Now in 1995, Jude in 1996 and Welcome to Sarajevo in 1997.

In 1997, he secured his breakout television role as Adam Williams in Cold Feet, a character he played until 2003 and again from 2016 until 2020. In that time he also appeared in the film Waking Ned, two series of Playing the Field, Touching Evil, his feature film lead debut Lucky Break, and Paul Greengrass's controversial television film Bloody Sunday, as Ivan Cooper. After Bloody Sunday, Nesbitt started to take on more dramatic roles, appearing in five series of Murphy's Law (2003–2007), the two-part television film Passer By (2004), Steven Moffat's Jekyll (2007), and the Iraq War drama Occupation (2009). He has also furthered his feature film career by taking roles in Woody Allen's Match Point (2005), the Troubles drama Five Minutes of Heaven (2009), the thriller Outcast (2010), Nadia Tass's Matching Jack (2010), and Emilio Estevez's The Way (2010). He starred in the ITV medical drama series Monroe (2011–2012) and has a role as the dwarf Bofur in Peter Jackson's The Hobbit trilogy (2012–2014).

Nesbitt has also taken on theatrical roles throughout his career; between 1987 and 1994, he appeared in no less than five major plays, including the musical Up on the Roof, a world tour of Hamlet, and the Troubles drama Paddywack. After a break of eleven years, Nesbitt returned to the stage to make his London West End debut in Owen McCafferty's Shoot the Crow (2005).

Filmography

Television

Film

Theatre

Radio

Footnotes

References

External links 

0.0270270 (The Story of a Gambler). De Novo Pictures (hosted on MySpace Video). URL retrieved on 5 March 2011.

Male actor filmographies
British filmographies
Irish filmographies